Monica Bedi (born 18 January 1975) is an Indian actress and television presenter.  She debuted in Hindi films in the mid-1990s and her notable work includes Pyaar Ishq Aur Mohabbat and Jodi No.1. She is known for participating in Bigg Boss 2 and  Jhalak Dikhhla Jaa 2 and playing Gumaan Kaur Vyas in Star Plus's show Saraswatichandra.

Early life
Bedi is a Punjabi and was born to Prem Kumar Bedi and Shakuntala Bedi in the village Chabbewal, Hoshiarpur district, Punjab. Her parents moved to Drammen, Norway in 1979. She completed her education from Delhi University in 1995.

Prison Sentence
In September 2002, Bedi and Abu Salem, an Indian gangster were arrested and later served prison sentences in Portugal for entering the country on forged documents. In 2006, an Indian Court convicted Bedi for procuring a passport on a fictitious name. In November 2010, the Supreme Court of India upheld her conviction but reduced the prison sentence to the period that she had already served. Various newspaper including magazines had reported that Abu used his criminal power to get roles for Monica Bedi in Bollywood.

Career

Bedi got her first role in Telugu language film Taj Mahal (1995), produced by D. Ramanaidu. Ramanaidu also cast her in Sivayya and Speed Dancer. She debuted in Bollywood in 1995 with Surakshaa.

Bedi was a participant in Bigg Boss Season 2, a television reality show. She was one of the contestants of the reality shows Jhalak Dikhhla Jaa 3 and  Desi Girl.

She sang the chants "EkOnkar" for a spiritual music album on Universal Music.

Bedi acted in the Punjabi movie Sirphire (2012), directed by Harjit Singh Ricky.

From 2013 to 2014, Bedi played a negative role of Ghumman in Star Plus' show Saraswatichandra.

Filmography

Television

References

External links
 
 Monica Bedi on Facebook

Living people
1975 births
Actresses in Hindi cinema
Actresses in Bengali cinema
Actresses in Kannada cinema
Actresses in Punjabi cinema
Actresses in Tamil cinema
Actresses in Telugu cinema
Indian film actresses
Bigg Boss (Hindi TV series) contestants
People from Hoshiarpur district
Punjabi people